John of Grumbach (?–1466) was prince-bishop of Würzburg as "John III" from 1455 until his death in 1466.

Literature 
 
 Alfred Wendehorst: Das Bistum Würzburg Teil 3 - Die Bischofsreihe von 1455 bis 1617. (= Germania Sacra; Neue Folge 13). Berlin, 1969. pp. 3–20 (digitalised)

External links 
 Die Geschichte der Wappen der Würzburger Fürstbischöfe von Dr. Bernhard Peter
 Zeremonienschwert des Fürstbischofs

References 

Prince-Bishops of Würzburg
15th-century Roman Catholic bishops in Bavaria
1466 deaths
Year of birth unknown